Zyzzogeton is a rare genus of leafhoppers endemic to South America. It is named after a former genus Zyzza (probably an onomatopoeia), appended with the ancient Greek geitōn ( ‘neighbour’).

The word is known for being the last word defined in the Webster's New International Dictionary, Unabridged released in September 1961. It also appears in the 1939 Second edition, and is still present in current versions.

Species
 Zyzzogeton haenschi Breddin, 1902
 Zyzzogeton quadrimaculata Nielson & Godoy, 1995
 Zyzzogeton viridipennis (Latreille, 1809)

See also
 Zyzzyva, a weevil, another "last entry"

References

Proconiini
Hemiptera of South America
Cicadellidae genera